Mark Gordon (1953–2018) was an American bridge player. He won a World Championship in 2013 in Bali.

Bridge accomplishments

Wins
 World Championships (1)
 Transnational Teams 2013 
 North American Bridge Championships (2)
 Keohane North American Swiss Teams (1) 2002 
 Roth Open Swiss Teams (1) 2011

Runners-up

Notes

External links
 

1953 births
2018 deaths
American contract bridge players